The 4th Krajina Division (Serbo-Croatian Latin: Četvrta krajiška divizija) was a Yugoslav Partisan division formed in Glamočko polje on 9 November 1942. On the day of formation it consisted of 4,371 soldiers in three brigades: 2nd Krajina Brigade, 5th Krajina Brigade and 6th Krajina Brigade. Commander of the division was Josip Mažar Šoša, while its political commissar was Milinko Kušić. During the war it mostly operated in western and central Bosnia. It was a part of 1st Bosnian Corps until 11 May 1943 when it became part of 2nd Bosnian Corps.

References 

Divisions of the Yugoslav Partisans
Military units and formations established in 1942